Noble Households: Eighteenth-Century Inventories of Great English Houses presents transcripts of inventories of nine great country houses and four London town houses as a tribute to the late historian John Cornforth.

Summary
The inventories document in astounding detail the taste and lifestyle of leading noble families and their households. John Cornforth first "put forward the idea of this publication as a primary resource for the interpretation of the historic interior". As the book's dust-wrapper states, it was his hope that it "would revitalise the study of the great house in the eighteenth century".

Structure
The inventories, compiled for a variety of purposes by professional appraisers in conjunction with family members or their stewards, are supplemented with a glossary and index to the items listed. The inventories are grouped as follows:

Part I: Montagu Inventories
Montagu House, Bloomsbury, London, 1709 and 1733 
Boughton House, Northamptonshire, 1709, 1718 and 1730
Ditton House, Buckinghamshire, 1709 
Montagu House, Whitehall, London, 1746 
Part II: The Drayton Inventories
Drayton House, Northamptonshire, 1710 and 1724 
Part III: The Ditchley Inventories
Ditchley, Oxfordshire, 1743 and 1772 
Part IV: Norfolk Inventories
Houghton Hall, 1745 and 1792
Holkham Hall, Norfolk, and Thanet House, London, 1760 
Part V: Inventories of the Marquess of Carmarthen
Kiveton and Thorp Salvin, Yorkshire, 1727 
Part VI: The Marlborough Inventories
Blenheim Palace, Oxfordshire, and Marlborough House, London, 1740

The end matter comprises:
 Glossary and concordance
 Further reading (John Cornforth's writings which draw on the inventories in this book)
 Credits (photographs and inventories)
 Index

Critical reception
In her review in Apollo, Susan Jenkins encapsulated Cornforth's intentions when she averred that with the selection of inventories in the book, "Cornforth hoped to inspire another generation of scholars to take his work forward into the 21st century". This view was endorsed by James Miller when he wrote in the Times Literary Supplement, "It is to be hoped that more inventories will now be published as they are the bedrock of the understanding of the taste of a particular period."

Writing in the Burlington Magazine, Andrew Moore saw the book as "an important step in the wider recognition of archival studies in relation to the social and cultural history of England"; whereas in the Art Newspaper John Harris acknowledged the usefulness of the book's index, when he declared that it "demonstrates the value of inventories for an understanding of the furnished interior'.

Reviewing the book for Studies in the Decorative Arts, the Bard Graduate Center's journal, Simon Swynfen Jervis commented that "When inventories are reasonably comprehensive and are ordered room by room ... —and this applies to all those in Noble Households—they are difficult to surpass as documents of most aspects of interior decoration."

Notes

External links
 Book's official website

2006 non-fiction books
British non-fiction books
Cultural history
Social history
18th century in England
Country houses in England
Furniture